Laurence D. "Larry" Weiss (born March 25, 1941) is an American songwriter and musician.  He wrote "Rhinestone Cowboy", a US no.1 hit for Glen Campbell in 1975; and co-wrote "Bend Me, Shape Me", "Hi Ho Silver Lining" and several other international hits.

Biography
Weiss was born in Newark, New Jersey, and grew up in Queens, New York. He started writing songs in his teens, and continued to do so while working in his family's textile sales business, before working as a freelance songwriter for Wes Farrell. His first break came in 1963 when Nat "King" Cole recorded "Mr. Wishing Well", a song Weiss co-wrote with Lockie Edwards Jr. (1936–2012). Weiss also wrote for R&B acts including Baby Washington, Chuck Jackson and The Shirelles.

In the mid and late 1960s Weiss co-wrote several successful songs with lyricist Scott English.  These included "Bend Me, Shape Me", a hit for The American Breed (US no.5, UK no.24) and Amen Corner (UK no.3); "Hi Ho Silver Lining", a UK hit for Jeff Beck (UK no.14); and "Help Me Girl", a hit for Eric Burdon & The Animals (US no.29, UK no.14).  He also co-wrote, with Jerry Ross, "Mr. Dream Merchant", a hit for Jerry Butler (US no.38) and later (as "Dream Merchant") for New Birth (US no.36).

In 1971, he moved with his family from New York to Los Angeles, where he worked for Famous Music. He recorded a singer-songwriter album, Black & Blue Suite, in 1974 for 20th Century Records. The album's opening track, "Rhinestone Cowboy", was released as a single and rose to no.24 on the Billboard adult contemporary chart. Glen Campbell heard and liked the song, and recorded it; his version became an international hit, reaching no.1 in the US and several other countries, and no.4 in the UK, and was the Country Music Association's Song of the Year in 1976. Another track from Black & Blue Suite, "Lay Me Down," was covered by Barry Manilow on his albums Tryin' to Get the Feeling and Barry Manilow Live and by Glen Campbell on his album Bloodline.

During the 1980s, Weiss performed the theme song for the popular sitcom Who's the Boss? during its first two seasons, from 1984 to 1986.

Weiss moved to Nashville in 1992, and continued to write songs for other artists, as well as developing his idea for a musical based around "Rhinestone Cowboy". He also released an album in his own name, Cuts and Scratches, in 2010.

References

External links
Official website

1941 births
Living people
Musicians from Newark, New Jersey
Songwriters from New York (state)